Sergei Nikolayevich Putilin (born 13 November 1986) is a Russian former professional football player.

Club career
He made his Russian Football National League debut for FC KAMAZ Naberezhnye Chelny on 18 April 2011 in a game against FC Torpedo Vladimir. He played 4 seasons in the FNL for Torpedo Vladimir, FC Ufa, FC Angusht Nazran and FC Torpedo Armavir.

External links
 

1986 births
People from Tikhoretsk
Living people
Russian footballers
Association football midfielders
FC Ufa players
FC KAMAZ Naberezhnye Chelny players
FC Luch Vladivostok players
FC Angusht Nazran players
FC SKA Rostov-on-Don players
FC Armavir players
FC Chernomorets Novorossiysk players
FC Torpedo Moscow players
FC Kuban Krasnodar players
FC Avangard Kursk players
FC Veles Moscow players
Sportspeople from Krasnodar Krai